Harrell can refer to:

 Harrell (name), given name and surname
 Harrell, Alabama, United States
 Harrell, Arkansas, United States

See also
Harrells, North Carolina, United States
Harrel, surname